First of the Big Bands – BBC Live in Concert 1974 is a live album recorded on September 12, 1974 at the London Palladium by Tony Ashton and Jon Lord and their all-star band featuring Ian Paice, Carmine Appice, Dick Parry and Max Middleton among others. The setlist features mainly songs off the album First of the Big Bands by Ashton & Lord, released in 1974. The live album was released in 1993 by Windsong International.

Track listing
 "We're Gonna Make It" (4.29)
 "I've Been Lonely" (4.15)
 "Silly Boy" (5.23)
 "The Jam" (5.20)
 "Downside Upside Down" (6.11)
 "Shut Up" (3.42)
 "Ballad of Mr. Giver" (7.12)
 "Celebration" (5.29)
 "The Resurrection Shuffle" (7.11)

Production notes
 Recorded live at the London Palladium on September 12, 1974
 Produced by Jeff Griffin
 All tracks written by Jon Lord and Tony Ashton, except "I've Been Lonely" and "The Resurrection Shuffle" written by Tony Ashton
 An original sound recording made by BBC Radio 1 "Live in Concert"
 Compiled and co-ordinated by Jo Bourhill

Personnel
 Tony Ashton - Hammond organ, piano, vocals
 Jon Lord - Hammond organ, piano
 Ian Paice - Drums
 Carmine Appice - Drums
 Pat Donaldson - Bass guitar
 Jim Cregan - guitar
 Ray Fenwick - guitar
 Dave Caswell - Trumpet
 Mike Davis - Trumpet
 Howie Casey - Saxophone
 Dick Parry - Saxophone
 Geoff Dolby - Saxophone
 John Mumford - Trombone
 Max Middleton - Electric piano
 Jimmy Helms - Backing vocals
 Madeline Bell - Backing vocals
 Jo-Ann Williams - Backing vocals
 Graham White - Backing vocals
 Kenny Rowe - Backing vocals
 Tony Ferguson - Backing vocals
 Roger Willis - Backing vocals

1974 live albums